Shigehisa (written: 繁久 or 茂久) is a masculine Japanese given name. Notable people with the name include:

, Japanese astronomer
, American historian

See also
8736 Shigehisa, main-belt asteroid

Japanese masculine given names